Na'ura is an Arab village located in northern Israel. Located to the east of Afula, it falls under the jurisdiction of the Gilboa Regional Council.

See also
Arab localities in Israel

References

Bibliography

   (p. 85)

 (p. 736)

 (p. 124)

 (p. 157)
 (p. 169)

  (p. 166)
 (Robinson and Smith, 1856, p. 338)

External links
Welcome To Na'ura
Survey of Western Palestine, Map 9:     IAA, Wikimedia commons

Arab villages in Israel
Populated places in Northern District (Israel)